The 13th Annual Interactive Achievement Awards is the 13th edition of the Interactive Achievement Awards, an annual awards event that honors the best games in the video game industry. It was also held as part of the Academy's 2010 D.I.C.E. Summit, and was hosted by stand up comedian Jay Mohr.

Uncharted 2: Among Thieves received the most nominations and won the most awards, including Game of the Year. Sony Computer Entertainment published the nominees and award winners with Naughty Dog as the most nominated and award winning developer.

Mark Cerny, known for Crash Bandicoot and Spyro,  received the of the Academy of Interactive Arts & Sciences Hall of Fame Award. Doug Lowenstein, founder of the Entertainment Software Association (ESA), received the Lifetime Achievement Award. David Crane, co-founder of Activision was the recipient of the Pioneer Award.

Winners and Nominees
Winners are listed first, highlighted in boldface, and indicated with a double dagger.

Special Awards

Hall of Fame
 Bruce Shelley

Lifetime Achievement
 Douglas Lowenstein

Pioneer
 David Crane

Games with multiple nominations and awards

The following 23 games received multiple nominations:

The following five games received multiple awards:

Companies with multiple nominations

Companies that received multiple nominations as either a developer or a publisher.

Companies that received multiple awards as either a developer or a publisher.

External links

References

2010 awards
2010 awards in the United States
February 2010 events in the United States
2009 in video gaming
D.I.C.E. Award ceremonies